Hylophilodes is a genus of moths of the family Nolidae.

Species
Hylophilodes buddhae (Alpheraky, 1897)
Hylophilodes burmana Berio, 1973
Hylophilodes dubia Prout, 1926
Hylophilodes elegans Draudt, 1950
Hylophilodes esakii Fukushima, 1943
Hylophilodes orientalis (Hampson, 1894)
Hylophilodes pseudorientalis Prout, 1921
Hylophilodes rara Fukushima, 1943
Hylophilodes rubromarginata (Bethune-Baker, 1906)
Hylophilodes tortriciformis Strand, 1917
Hylophilodes tsukusensis Nagano, 1918

References

Chloephorinae